Mistie McCray Bass (born December 2, 1983) is an American professional women's basketball player who is currently a free agent.

High school career
Bass graduated from George S. Parker High School in Janesville in 2002, having helped the school win the state championship two years in a row. As a freshman, she broke a defender's arm while the defender attempted to take a charge. She is the only player in the state to be named Player of the Year three times. She also was elected first team USA Today All-America, second team Parade All-America, second team School Sports All-America, third team Student Sports All-America, two time Wisconsin Gatorade Play of the year and first team All-State. Mistie was selected to play in the Phoenix/WBCA High School All-America game, notching six points and nine rebounds. Bass played in the inaugural McDonald's All-America game.

College career
She graduated from Duke University in 2006. At Duke, she played for the Blue Devils and was a part of two Final Fours; 2003 and 2006 (Contended in the National Championship game). She finished her career ranking eighth in points (1,409), eighth in field goals made (557), fifth in field goal percentage (.567), fifth in rebounds (800), fifth in blocks (131), eighth in free throws made (295), seventh in free throws attempted (459), eighth in double-figure scoring games (78), first in wins (127) and tied for fourth in ACC regular season wins (55). She was also a member of Zeta Phi Beta sorority.

Duke statistics
Source

Professional career
During the 2006 WNBA Draft, Bass was originally selected by the Phoenix Mercury but was later traded to the Houston Comets.  In her first season Bass played sparingly, averaging 10.1 minutes per game, behind all-stars Sheryl Swoopes, Tina Thompson and Dawn Staley.  During 2007 and 2008, Bass continued to play as a reserve forward for the Comets, wearing jersey number 8.

After the Comets disbanded in the fall of 2008, Bass was selected by the Chicago Sky as the third pick in the dispersal draft for former Comets players.

She played for Mersin in Turkey during the 2008–09 WNBA off-season.

She played for the Connecticut Sun for two seasons (2012–2013).

She won a WNBA championship in the 2014 season with the Phoenix Mercury.

Bass played one season with UC Canberra Capitals in the Australian WNBL 2017/2018

Personal life 
She is the daughter of rock and roll singer and dancer Chubby Checker.

References

External links

WNBA player profile
Mistie's WNBA blog
Duke Blue Devils bio

1983 births
Living people
American expatriate basketball people in Turkey
American women's basketball players
Basketball players from Wisconsin
Chicago Sky players
Connecticut Sun players
Duke Blue Devils women's basketball players
Houston Comets players
McDonald's High School All-Americans
Mersin Büyükşehir Belediyesi women's basketball players
Parade High School All-Americans (girls' basketball)
Phoenix Mercury draft picks
Phoenix Mercury players
Power forwards (basketball)
Sportspeople from Janesville, Wisconsin